Lt Headtrip (pronounced /lo͞oˈtenənt hedtrip/) is an American rapper and producer. He is the founder of the record label 'we are the karma kids' (WATKK) and has spent the last decade curating projects and events in the local music scene in Brooklyn, Manhattan, and Queens. He is also a seasoned touring musician and studio engineer, holding a master's degree in linguistics.

Life and career

Early life 
Born Patrick Childers in Toledo, Ohio in 1987 to mother Kimberly F. Childers Major, an artist, and father William Emerson Childers, the President and CEO of United Way of Portage County. He spent much of his childhood in Kent, Ohio. He learned to use audio engineering software early and has been utilizing that software to create when he was 13 years old. His music teacher in 6th grade, Mrs. Deb Wade, taught Sonic Foundry Acid Pro to all her middle school students. He stayed after school learning the program for 6-8th grade and continued making music with Acid after heading to high school. Early influences were Primus, Aesop Rock, Gorillaz, Outkast, El-P, and ODB. He moved to New York in 2006 to pursue a career in music, and quickly became active in the Long Island DIY punk rock scene. He moved Astoria, Queens in 2010, where he would operate as an artist, studio engineer, live event organizer and project manager for the next nine years.

Recent work 

In addition to his responsibilities as a writer, performer, promoter and organizer, he produces, records, and engineers as the head of an independent record label known as we are the karma kids (WATKK). WATKK had officially released twenty albums, as well as a number of unofficial releases dating back to 2006. He also tours with the neo-soul band, Bassel & The Supernaturals.

In 2020, Trip released two albums with different producers, breaking a decade-long pattern of waiting years between solo album releases. 'Pressure of the Tempest,' Trip's spring release, is a departure from the often furious, chaotic temperament of Headtrip’s previous work, as much as it is a journal of his departure from NYC. The 8 track album is subsequent to his previous self-produced solo record, Comedy of the Filthbeast (2017), which illustrates the multiplicity of his tormented character. Pressure of the Tempest, on the other hand, take a more straightforward approach to storytelling. Hosting no guest verses on the short but dense project, Headtrip explores an array of personal topics, including a friendship with an alcoholic artist, failed romantic encounters, and a miscarriage, as well as a uncharacteristically tender song about an old flame reignited. The record is entirely produced by long-time collaborator, Rich Courage, who combines patched synths, clunky randomized drum patterns, and guitars to achieve a powerful, cinematic soundscape. His amalgam of analog and digital instruments reflects Headtrip’s natural yet practiced writing style and delivery, and lends a robust, dynamic aesthetic.

In the summer of 2020, Lt Headtrip delivered 'Dreamery,' an unexpectedly whimsical album narrating his experience as a summer worker on an isolated tourist island. Headtrip’s sketches of daily life weave in and out of producer, engineer and first-time collaborator C$Burns’ funky, psychedelic soundscape. The quirky, routine antics of the service industry, the panic of a tourist trap that suddenly loses cell phone service, and eccentric, drug-obsessed coworkers all find their way into Trip’s intricate web. True to form, the notoriously sinister rapper eventually delves into darker topics over Burn’s moody selections, such as the backlash of the same amphetamines that sustain a demanding lifestyle, as well as an unnerving examination of his own perception, the ever-looming feeling that he’s trapped within another being’s dream, an impotent pawn in an unseen force’s fantasy. 

Lt Headtrip a.k.a. Filthbeast, Uncle Comfortable and Dome Wrecker writes, records, and performed independently as well as part of a group that he co-founded called the Karma Kids. Other artists in the Karma Kids include Samurai Banana, Googie, Duncecap, and MC Eleven.

Discography 
 "Steinway" by Lt Headtrip, produced by Lt Headtrip (2022)
 "Dreamery" by Lt Headtrip, produced by C$Burns (2020)
 "Pressure of the Tempest" by Lt Headtrip, produced by Rich Courage (2020)
 "Blastmaster Baker VS. The Human Being Lawnmower” by Blastmaster Baker, produced by Headtrip (2019)
 "Word Art Gallery" by OLD SELF, produced by Headtrip (2018)
 "Comedy of the Filthbeast" by Lt Headtrip, 2017
 "TVNNELS" by Lt Headtrip with Bluelight
 "Kombinations" by MC Eleven & the Karma Kids, 2016
 "Bald Afro" by Bald Afro, 2015
 "Impervious Machine v1.28571429" by Impervious Machine (Lt Headtrip and Defpotec), 2014
 "Webtrip" by Webtrip (Lt Headtrip and Gruff Lion), 2013
 "Cousin Id" by Sarcasmo, 2012
 "Keep out of the Attic" by Lt Headtrip, 2011
 "Raw Dog" by Lt Headtrip, 2009
 "Drumskin" by Sarcasmo (Lt Headtrip and Samurai Banana), 2007
 "The Boy Who Cried Flow" by Lt Headtrip, 2006

References 

American hip hop singers
Musicians from Ohio